Ribes pinetorum, the orange gooseberry, is a plant species native to Arizona and New Mexico. It grows in coniferous forests at elevations of 1900–3100 m.

Ribes pinetorum is a shrub up to 2 m (80 inches) tall, lacking prickles on the stems. Flowers are solitary, orange, tubular, hanging. Fruits are purple, spherical, about 13 mm (0.52 inch) across, with spines but considered by many people to be good-tasting.

References

pinetorum
Flora of Arizona
Plants described in 1881
Flora of New Mexico